William James Ferrario (born September 22, 1978 in Scranton, Pennsylvania) is a former American football offensive lineman in the National Football League primarily with the Green Bay Packers.

Early years
Ferrario graduated from West Scranton High School. He is an Eagle Scout.

College career
Ferrario was a second-team All-Big Ten guard at the University of Wisconsin–Madison, where he paved the way for Heisman Trophy winner Ron Dayne and Michael Bennett. He started all 50 games in his career (only the 3rd player in Big Ten history to accomplish this).  He helped Wisconsin win back to back Rose Bowl Championships-1999 and 2000 (only Big Ten school to do so).

Professional career
Ferrario was a 4th round selection (201st overall pick) in the 2001 NFL Draft by the Green Bay Packers. He was with the Packers through the 2002 season where he saw action in all 16 games. Waived by Green Bay in 2003, Ferrario signed with the Washington Redskins on February 4, 2004 only to be released on September 5, 2004. He signed with the Carolina Panthers on November 11, 2004 but did not play in any games that season. Farrario was released by the Panthers on August 28, 2005.

Life after football
Ferrario now works as a sales representative. He also works with local athletes to improve their skills and fundamentals, and at summer football camps.

On January 2, 2023, Ferrario was reported to police for concerning behavior at his Wausau, Wisconsin home. That same evening, he was taken to a hotel room. Around 8 p.m. the following night, Ferrario was arrested for disorderly conduct and booked within the  Marathon County Jail. He also faces charges for a second OWI offense stemming from an October 12, 2022 incident where Ferrario had lost control of his vehicle and crashed. He was nearly three times the legal limit for motor vehicle operation in this incident. 

On February 27, 2023, Ferrario was arrested in Eau Claire County on an arrest warrant and faces multiple charges including stalking, intimidation of a victim and more after breaking bond conditions, according to a Marathon County criminal complaint.

External links

References

1978 births
Living people
Sportspeople from Scranton, Pennsylvania
Players of American football from Pennsylvania
American football offensive guards
Wisconsin Badgers football players
Green Bay Packers players
Carolina Panthers players